Edgecumbe College is a secondary school located in Edgecumbe, New Zealand, and is the only secondary school in the town. It serves students from Year 9 to Year 13, and had a roll of 213 as of late 2014.

Students 
According to the Ministry of Education, the ethnic composition of Edgecumbe College is 76% Māori, 22% New Zealand European and 2% other. 53% of students are Male and 47% are Female. Students come from the township of Edgecumbe as well as the surrounding settlements.

Facilities 
According to the website of the College, the college has a solar heated swimming pool, gymnasium, music suite, library, technology and computer facilities, as well as classrooms and support facilities.

References

External links
School Website

Secondary schools in the Bay of Plenty Region
Whakatane District